Albano Vicariotto (25 January 1931 – 25 December 2019) was an Italian footballer who played as a midfielder.

Career
Born in Vicenza, Vicariotto made his debut for his hometown team Vicenza at the age of 17. After 6 goals in 43 appearances for the club in two years he transferred to AC Milan, where he made a further two appearances. He then spent time with Torino and Padova before returning to AC Milan in 1953, where he scored 8 goals in 28 appearances over the next two years. He later played for Pro Patria, Palermo and Pisa.

References

1931 births
2019 deaths
Italian footballers
L.R. Vicenza players
A.C. Milan players
Torino F.C. players
Calcio Padova players
Aurora Pro Patria 1919 players
Palermo F.C. players
Pisa S.C. players
F.C. Arzignano Valchiampo players
Serie A players
Serie B players
Association football midfielders